Lewis ab Owen ap Meurig (by 1524 – 1590) of Brondeg, near Newborough, Anglesey, Wales, was a Welsh politician.

Career
He was elected a Member of Parliament (MP) for Anglesey 1553 and 1572 and appointed Sheriff of Anglesey for 1558–1559.

References

Year of birth missing
1590 deaths
Members of the Parliament of England (pre-1707) for constituencies in Wales
16th-century Welsh politicians
People from Anglesey
16th-century births
High Sheriffs of Anglesey